Ana Perović (Serbian Cyrillic: Ана Перовић; born July 8, 1977) is a Serbian former female basketball player.
She played for national Serbian team (2007-2009) : she scored 10.7 pts and 4.7 rbds during the Euro 2009. She played in many European championships. She played for Basket Landes 2008-2010 and then for Pau Lacq Orthez (6.8 pts, 2.2 rbds), then Mourenx, and CEP Chalosse / Elan Chalossais (2012-2017).

References

External links
Profile at eurobasket.com

1977 births
Living people
Basketball players from Niš
Centers (basketball)
Serbian women's basketball players